Majhi Ramdas Tudu (also known as Majhi Ramdas Tudu Reska) (1854—1951) was a Santhali writer and educator. He is the most notable writer in the early period of Santhali literature. He wrote a book on the traditional Santhal rituals, named Kherowal Bongso Dharam Punthi, in 1894. Every religion has its own book about their religion, culture, spiritual thoughts, and their ideas about life. He is the first person who captures the daily life of tribal Santhal peoples in his book. University of Calcutta honored him with the D.Litt title for his contribution to Santali literature and culture.

In 1951, Suniti Kumar Chatterjee translated his book into Bengali script.

Life
Majhi Ramdas Tudu Reska was born in 1854 in Karuwakta village of East Singhbhum district, Jharkhand, India. He is the son of Sitaram Tudu (father) and Manjadari Tudu (mother).

References

1854 births
1951 deaths
Adivasi writers
20th-century Indian linguists
20th-century Indian poets
Santali people
Santali writers
People from East Singhbhum district